Devdutt Padikkal (born 7 July 2000) is an Indian International cricketer who plays for Karnataka in domestic cricket and Rajasthan Royals in Indian Premier League (IPL). He made his India debut in the 2021 away T20I against Sri Lanka. He has also played for the India under-19 team.

Early life
Padikkal was born on 7 July 2000 in Edappal, Kerala to Ambili Padikkal and Babu Kunnath. In 2011, his family moved from Hyderabad to Bangalore, where he began training at the Karnataka Institute of Cricket. Starting from 2014, he represented Karnataka in under-16 and under-19 age categories. In 2017, he was selected by Bellary Tuskers in the Karnataka Premier League.

Career
He made his first-class debut for Karnataka in the 2018–19 Ranji Trophy on 28 November 2018. In December 2018, he was bought by the Royal Challengers Bangalore in the player auction for the 2019 Indian Premier League. He became the first player in IPL history to score three fifties in his first four matches.

He made his List A debut on 26 September 2019, for Karnataka in the 2019–20 Vijay Hazare Trophy. He was the leading run-scorer in the tournament, with 609 runs in eleven matches.

In October 2019, he was named in India A's squad for the 2019–20 Deodhar Trophy. He made his Twenty20 debut on 8 November 2019, for Karnataka in the 2019–20 Syed Mushtaq Ali Trophy.

Padikkal won the Emerging Player Award for the 2020 Indian Premier League (IPL), playing for Royal Challengers Bangalore. He scored 473 runs in 15 matches for Royal Challengers Bangalore in his debut IPL season. He was selected in Karnataka's squad for the 2021 Syed Mushtaq Ali Trophy. On 22 April 2021, in the 2021 Indian Premier League, Padikkal scored 101 not out, as Royal Challengers Bangalore beat the Rajasthan Royals by ten wickets.

In June 2021, he was named in India's One Day International (ODI) and Twenty20 International (T20I) squads for their series against Sri Lanka. He made his T20I debut on 28 July 2021, for India against Sri Lanka.

In February 2022, he was bought by the Rajasthan Royals in the auction for the 2022 Indian Premier League tournament. In March 2022, Padikkal scored his maiden first-class century, with 178 runs in the 2021–22 Ranji Trophy match against Puducherry. In April 2022, while playing for the Rajasthan Royals, he scored his 1,000 run in the IPL.

Honours

 Indian Premier League runner up 2022

References

External links
 

2000 births
Living people
Indian cricketers
India Twenty20 International cricketers
Karnataka cricketers
Royal Challengers Bangalore cricketers
Rajasthan Royals cricketers